Apple certification programs are IT professional certifications for Apple Inc. products. They are designed to create a high level of technical proficiency among Macintosh service technicians, help desk support, technical support, system administrators, and professional users. Apple certification exams are offered at Prometric testing centers and Apple Authorized Training Centers, as well as online through Pearson Vue.

Hardware Certifications

These certifications are designed for individuals interested in becoming Apple service technicians, help desk, desktop support, or Macintosh consultants who need all-around experience in servicing Macintosh computers. It includes two separate certifications.

Apple Certified Macintosh Technician
This certification is for the repair and diagnostics of all Macintosh desktops, portables, and servers. This certification is required to perform warranted hardware repairs for an Apple Authorized Service Provider.

Required exams
  Apple Service Fundamentals Exam (Pearson Vue exam: #SVC-16A)
  ACMT 2016 Mac Service Certification Exam(Pearson Vue exam: #MAC-16A)

Previously, the hardware certification came in the combination of Apple Certified Desktop Technician (ACDT) and Apple Certified Portable Technician (ACPT), but has been combined into a single hardware certification. This certification also includes an extensive knowledge of Apple's operating system OS X 10.6 Snow Leopard including its installation, settings, troubleshooting, and applications.

Before November 2014, the Apple Certified Macintosh Technician did not cover the Retina MacBook Pro lineup, as well as all Macs released after 2012. To repair a Late-2013 13-inch MacBook Pro with Retina Display, one must be an Apple Certified Macintosh Technician and pass an exam for repairing 13-inch Retina MacBook Pros (Late 2013 to Early 2015). All technicians who received certification after November 20, 2014 are certified to repair any Mac released before 2015.

Pro Apps certifications
These certifications are designed for individuals who need a high skill-level in the use of Apple's pro applications or for professionals who provide support for Final Cut Pro software and peripheral devices.

Apple Certified Pro
 Final Cut Pro X
 Logic Pro X
 Logic Pro X 10.1
 Motion 5 (Level One)

IT Professional Certifications
These certifications are designed for IT professionals who support Mac OS X or who perform Mac OS X desktop support and troubleshooting, such as help desk staff, system administrators, service technicians, and service desk personnel. Each certification is specific to the version of OS X it relates to; an administrator who was qualified as ACTC for OS X 10.4 Tiger is not an ACTC for 10.6 Snow Leopard. Recertification exams are available to speed the process of moving from one version to the next. OS X 10.6 exams were only available until 31 May 2012, when they were withdrawn.

Apple Certified Technical Coordinator (ACTC)
This certification is designed for system administrators who provide support to OS X users, as well as maintain the OS X Server platform.

Required exams
 OS X Support Essentials v10.6 through v10.10
 OS X Server Essentials v10.6 through v10.10

The ACTC certification pathway was withdrawn for new students in 2015.

Apple Certified System Administrator (ACSA)

This certification is catered for system administrators managing large multiplatform IT networks using Mac OS X Server and other Apple technologies. The ACSA program has been changed to offer individuals more flexibility and is now focused on individual job functions. Each passed exam earns a specialization certificate and a specific number of credits toward ACSA certification, which requires a total of 7 valid (unexpired) credits. OS X 10.6 is the last version to have this certification, there is no equivalent for OS X 10.7 Lion.

Required exams
 Mac OS X Server Essentials v10.6 (Prometric exam: #9L0-510, withdrawn May 31, 2012)
 Mac OS X Deployment v10.6 (Prometric exam: #9L0-623, withdrawn May 31, 2012)
 Mac OS X Directory Services v10.6 (Prometric exam: #9L0-624, withdrawn May 31, 2012)
 Mac OS X Security & Mobility v10.6 (Prometric exam: #9L0-625, withdrawn May 31, 2012)

Apple Certified Media Administrator (ACMA)
Verifies in-depth knowledge of Xsan architecture, including an ability to install and configure systems, architect and maintain networks, customize and troubleshoot services, and integrate Mac OS X, Final Cut Server, and other Apple technologies within an Xsan installation. ACMA certification is for system administrators and technicians working for resellers, post houses, studios or other large facilities. To earn ACMA status, students must pass three required exams and one elective exam as outlined below.

Required Exams
 Mac OS X Server Essentials v10.6 (Prometric exam: #9L0-510)
 Xsan 2 Administration (Prometric exam: #9L0-622, withdrawn May 31, 2012)
 Final Cut Server Level One (Prometric exam: #9L0-980)
Plus one of the following:
 Mac OS X Support Essentials v10.6 (Prometric exam: #9L0-403, withdrawn May 31, 2012)
 Mac OS X Directory Services v10.6 (Prometric exam: #9L0-624, withdrawn May 31, 2012)
 Mac OS X Deployment v10.6 (Prometric exam: #9L0-623, withdrawn May 31, 2012)
 Final Cut Pro Level One (Prometric exam: #9L0-827)
 Apple Certificate Support Pro (ACSP 10.11) OS X El Capitan (iLearn: Advance ACSP resource)

Xsan 2 Administrator
Verifies comprehensive knowledge of Apple's SAN file system for Mac OS X. An Xsan Administrator is responsible for the life cycle of Xsan, including installation, deployment, infrastructure. To earn Xsan Administrator certification, students must pass one exam. Xsan 2 exams are only available until 31 May 2012, when they will be withdrawn following Apple's integration of Xsan into OS X Server 10.7.

Required Exam
 Xsan 2 Administration (Prometric exam: #9L0-622, withdrawn May 31, 2012)

Associate Certifications
Certified Associate certifications are designed for professionals, educators and students to validate their skills in Apple's digital lifestyle and authoring applications and iWork.

Apple Certified Associate in iWork
Required exam
 iWork Level One (Prometric exam: #9L0-806)

List of Apple certification programs

 Apple Authorized Training Centers (AATC)

Hardware
 Apple Certified Macintosh Technician (ACMT)
 Apple Certified Desktop Technician (ACDT)
 Apple Certified Portable Technician (ACPT)

Trainers and Training Centers
 Apple Certified Trainer (ACT)
 Apple Authorized Training Centers (AATCs)
 Apple Authorized Training Centers for Education (AATCEs)

Software Certifications
 Apple Certified Pro
 Final Cut Pro
 Final Cut Express
 Color
 DVD Studio Pro
 Motion
 Logic Pro
 Shake
 Color Management
 Xsan for Pro Video
 Aperture
 Soundtrack Pro
 Apple Certified Master Pro
 Final Cut Studio
 Logic Studio

Mac OS X and IT certifications
 Apple Certified Support Professional (ACSP)
 Apple Certified Technical Coordinator (ACTC)
 Apple Certified System Administrator (ACSA)
 Apple Certified Specialist (ACS)
 Apple Certified Media Administrator (ACMA)
 Xsan 2 Administrator

See also
 Apple Specialist
 Genius Bar
 One to One (service)
 Cisco Career Certifications
 Microsoft Certified Professional
 Oracle Certification Program
 Red Hat Certification Program
 Ubuntu Certified Professional

References

External links
 Apple's Certification Programs homepage
 Apple's online training locator
 Apple Certified Professionals Registry

Apple Inc. services
Information technology qualifications